Onda Assembly constituency is an assembly constituency in Bankura district in the Indian state of West Bengal.

Overview
As per orders of the Delimitation Commission, No. 254 Onda Assembly constituency is composed of the following: Onda community development block; and Bikna, Kosthia, Narrah and Sanbandha gram panchayats of Bankura II community development block.

Onda Assembly constituency is part of No. 37 Bishnupur (Lok Sabha constituency).

Members of Legislative Assembly

Election results

2016

2011

.# Swing calculated on Congress+Trinamool Congress vote percentages taken together in 2006.

1977-2006
In the 2006 state assembly elections, Tarapada Chakrabarti of Forward Bloc won the Onda assembly seat defeating his nearest rival Abeda Bibi Sk of Trinamool Congress. Contests in most years were multi cornered but only the winner and runners are being mentioned. Anil Mukherjee of Forward Bloc defeated Sk. Sajahan of Congress in 2001, Arup Khan of Congress in 1996, Sambhu Narayan Goswami of Congress in 1991, Tapan Banerjee of Congress in 1987 and Sambhu Narayan Goswami of Congress in 1982 and 1977.

1957-1972
Sambhu Narayan Goswami of Congress won in 1972. Manik Dutta of CPI(M) won in 1971. Anil Kumar Mukherjee of Forward Block won in 1969. S.Dutta of Congress won in 1967. Gokul Behari Das of Congress won in 1962. Onda dual seat was won by Gokul Behari Das and Ashutosh Mallick, both of Congress, in 1957. The Onda seat did not exist prior to that.

References

Assembly constituencies of West Bengal
Politics of Bankura district